Mycosphaerella recutita is a fungal plant pathogen.

In Iceland, it is rather common on withered Elymus caninus, Festuca rubra and Hierochloe odorata.

See also
 List of Mycosphaerella species

References

Fungal plant pathogens and diseases
recutita
Fungi described in 1823
Taxa named by Elias Magnus Fries